Sogndal Fotball is the association football department of Norwegian sports club Sogndal IL from Sogndal in Vestland. The club was founded in 1926. The men's team currently plays in 1. divisjon, the second tier of the Norwegian football league system. The club's home matches are played at the 5,622 capacity Fosshaugane Campus.

In 1976, the men's team were runners-up in the Norwegian Cup, losing 2–1 against SK Brann. Sogndal became the first third tier side to play a Norwegian Cup final. The 2017 season is Sogndal's most recent in Eliteserien, the top division.

History

Sogndal IL was founded 19 February 1926. The club's breakthrough in Norwegian football came in 1976, when they as a third tier side reached the final of the 1976 Norwegian Cup. Sogndal lost the final against Brann at Ullevaal Stadion with the score 2–1, Knut Christiansen scored Sogndal's goal. They played their first top division season in 1982, a season which the team ended the season in 11th position and relegation back to the second tier.

In the 1988 season, Sogndal's second season in the first tier, Sogndal finished in sixth place, their best ever finishing position. The club was relegated to the second tier in the following 1989 season. Sogndal won group A in the 1990 2. divisjon and won promotion. During the 1990s, Sogndal played five season in the first tier. In 1999, Sogndal received a transfer fee reported to be around NOK 40 million when Eirik Bakke was sold to Leeds United. From 2001 to 2004, Sogndal played four consecutive seasons in the top division, an achievement they repeated in the seasons 2011–14. The men's team was promoted to the 2011 Tippeligaen after winning the 2010 1. divisjon. In 2015, Sogndal won the 1. divisjon, their sixth second tier title. HamKam and Lyn are the other clubs with six Norwegian second tier titles.

In 2017, Sogndal relegated from Eliteserien, their eighth relegation from the top division, after losing the relegation play-offs on a penalty shoot-out against Ranheim.

Stadium

The club's stadium is Fosshaugane Campus. The stadium was renovated and reopened in 2006 and the name Campus was added because the local Sogn og Fjordane University College and high school is located in the stadium. The capacity is 5,622.

The attendance record of 7,025 spectators dates from the 1976 Norwegian Cup quarter-final against Start.

Recent seasons 

Source:

Achievements 

Eliteserien
6th place: 1988
8th place: 2001, 2003
Norwegian Cup; Runners-up: 1976
1. Divisjon / 2. Divisjon (6): 1981, 1987, 1990, 1993, 2010, 2015

Players

First-team squad
Current Squad

Former players

Coaching and administrative staff

Records
Most appearances: 611, Asle Hillestad
Most goals: 321, Svein Bakke
Most goals, Eliteserien: 46, Håvard Flo
Biggest win, Eliteserien: 5–0 vs. Odd, 15 June 2003
Biggest defeat, Eliteserien: 0–9 vs. Stabæk, 25 October 2009

Managerial history

 Ingvar Stadheim (1979–80, 1983–84)
 Harald Aabrekk (1990–92)
 Michael Speight (1999–00)
 Torbjørn Glomnes (1 January 2000 – 31 December 2002)
 Jan Halvor Halvorsen (1 January 2003 – 30 November 2004)
 Trond Fylling (2005)
 Stig Nord (2006 – 31 December 2006)
 Karl Oskar Emberland (1 January 2007 – 6 November 2009)
 Harald Aabrekk (1 January 2010 – 31 December 2011)
 Jonas Olsson (1 January 2012 – 31 December 2014) 
 Eirik Bakke (1 January 2015 – 31 December 2021)
 Tore André Flo (1 January 2022 – present)

References

External links 
 Official website
 Saftkokaradn supporter site

 
Football clubs in Norway
Eliteserien clubs
Sport in Sogn og Fjordane
Sogndal
Association football clubs established in 1926
1926 establishments in Norway